Hrastovac is a settlement in the municipality Garešnica, Bjelovar-Bilogora County in Croatia. According to the 2001 census, there are 539 inhabitants, in 167 of family households. It is connected by the D26 highway.

References 

Populated places in Bjelovar-Bilogora County